Howie Do It was a comedy television series, co-commissioned by Global and NBC, that stars Howie Mandel and DJ Ravidrums. The series features practical jokes in the vein of earlier shows like Just for Laughs: Gags, Punk'd or Candid Camera – the supposed twist being that the cameras are in the open, not hidden as in the other series. Mandel appears, often incognito, in several of the jokes. After the big reveal, either Howie or one of his assistants then delivers the line "This is Howie Do It!" The theme song to the show is a remix of "This Is How We Do It" by Montell Jordan, remixed by DJ Ravidrums. The show premiered on NBC and Global TV on January 9, 2009.

Mandel also served as an executive producer of the series, along with Scott Hallock and Kevin Healy of Spy TV, and Morgan Elliot and Michael Rotenberg. Six episodes were ordered. The studio segments were filmed at Caesars Windsor in Windsor, Ontario on August 24, 25, and 26, 2008. Tickets to the tapings were given out to new members of Harrah's Total Rewards program at the casino. The head of NBC's unscripted department, Craig Plestis, said that NBC's choice to share the costs of the series with Global was part of "trying to figure out new ways to do business as shows become more expensive."

U.S. Nielsen ratings

References

External links
 Official Website
 Josef Adalian, "NBC asks Howie Mandel to 'Do It'." Variety. April 17, 2008.
 "Global and NBC Say 'Deal' to New Howie Mandel Series." Broadcaster Magazine. April 18, 2008.

2000s American reality television series
2000s Canadian reality television series
2009 American television series debuts
2009 Canadian television series debuts
2000s American comedy television series
2000s Canadian comedy television series
2009 American television series endings
2009 Canadian television series endings
Global Television Network original programming
NBC original programming
Television series by Corus Entertainment
Television shows filmed in Windsor, Ontario